The Chairperson of Andhra Pradesh Legislative Council presides over the upper house of the Andhra Pradesh Legislature. The Chairperson regulates the debates and proceedings of the House.

The office was in existence from 1958 to 1985 and again from 2007 when the Andhra Sasana Mandali has been reconstituted.

As of 19 November 2021, the elected Chairperson of the council is Koyye Moshenu Raju.

List of chairperons

References

 
Andhra Pradesh Legislative Council
Lists of legislative speakers in India
Andhra Pradesh-related lists
Lists of people from Andhra Pradesh